Daria Semegen (born June 27, 1946) is a contemporary American composer of classical music. While she has composed pieces for traditional instruments – her Jeux des quatres (1970), for example, is scored for clarinet, trombone, cello, and piano – she is best known as a "respected electronic composer." She is a figure on the academic side of the electronic music genre, connected with the conservatory and the university (like her older contemporary Karlheinz Stockhausen), rather than the more popular expression of the genre that followed upon the widespread availability of synthesizers and personal computers in the 1970s and after. Her writing covers a range of topics related to musical composition and has been the subject of studies by other scholars.

Biography 
Born in Bamberg, West Germany of Ukrainian heritage, Semegen pursued an academic career in music, earning her MA from Yale University in 1971; she has studied at the Eastman School of Music and the Rochester Institute of Technology. She taught at the Columbia-Princeton Electronic Music Center (1971–75).

Career 
In a distinguished academic career in a field still heavily dominated by men, Semegen has received six grants from the National Endowment for the Arts; has been selected as a Fulbright fellow; and has been awarded fellowships at the MacDowell Colony, Tanglewood, the Chautauqua Institution, and Yaddo – among a range of other awards and distinctions. She is currently associate professor of composition, theory, and electronic music composition at Stony Brook University, and is director of its Electronic Music Studio.

Her best-known piece is probably Electronic Composition No. 1 (1971). Her work Arabesque premiered in 1992.

References

Further reading
Hinkle-Turner, A. E. "Daria Semegen: A Study of the Composer's Life, Work, and Music." Ph.D. dissertation, University of Illinois, Urbana.
Hinkle-Turner, Elizabeth. Women Composers and Music Technology in the United States: Crossing the Line, Ashgate Publishing, 2006.
Johnson, Rose-Marie. Violin Music by Women Composers: A Bio-Bibliographical Guide. Greenwood Press, Westport, CT, 1989.
Lerner, Ellen D. and David Wright. "Daria Semegen", Grove Music Online, ed. L. Macy (Accessed 26 October 2006).
Semegen, Daria. "Art-tickle: points to ponder." Perspectives of New Music, vol. 32, no. 1.
Simoni, Mary. Women and Music in America Since 1900: An Encyclopedia, Greenwood Press, 2002.

External links
 
 

1946 births
20th-century classical composers
American women classical composers
American classical composers
Living people
Pupils of Alexander Goehr
Pupils of Samuel Adler (composer)
Rochester Institute of Technology alumni
American women in electronic music
Yale University alumni
Eastman School of Music alumni
20th-century American women musicians
20th-century American composers
20th-century women composers
21st-century American women